Konowryggen is a mountain ridge in Oscar II Land at Spitsbergen, Svalbard. The ridge has a length of nine kilometers. On the eastern side is the glacier Konowbreen, and to the west is Gaffelbreen. The ridge is named after Wollert Konow.

References

Mountains of Spitsbergen